Listowel Amankona (born 4 April 2005) is a Ghanaian professional footballer who plays as midfielder for Ghanaian Premier League side Bechem United F.C.

Career 
Amankona started his career with Bechem United and he was moved to the senior team in September 2020, ahead of the 2020–21 season. He made his debut in a league match against Karela United on 18 December 2020, coming on in the 87th minute for Steven Owusu and scoring a 90th-minute goal to help Bechem seal 2–1 victory. On 29 January 2021, he scored his second goal after coming on in the 49th minute to score a late goal in the 89th minute from an assist from Francis Twene to help Bechem United to a 3–1 victory over Techiman Eleven Wonders to end their four-match winless run.

References

External links 
 

Living people
2005 births
Association football midfielders
Ghanaian footballers
Bechem United F.C. players
Ghana Premier League players